Metzora, Metzorah, M'tzora, Mezora, Metsora, M'tsora, Metsoro, Meṣora, or Maṣoro ( — Hebrew for "one being diseased," the ninth word, and the first distinctive word, in the parashah) is the 28th weekly Torah portion (parashah) in the annual Jewish cycle of Torah reading and the fifth in the Book of Leviticus. The parashah deals with ritual impurity. It addresses cleansing from skin disease (tzara'at), houses with an eruptive plague, male genital discharges, and menstruation. The parashah constitutes  The parashah is made up of 4,697 Hebrew letters, 1,274 Hebrew words, 90 verses, and 159 lines in a Torah Scroll (Sefer Torah).

Jews generally read it in April or, rarely, in early May. The lunisolar Hebrew calendar contains up to 55 weeks, the exact number varying between 50 in common years and 54 or 55 in leap years. In leap years (for example, 2022, 2024, and 2027), parashah Metzora is read separately. In common years (for example, 2020, 2021, 2023, 2025, 2026, 2028), parashah Metzora is combined with the previous parashah, Tazria, to help achieve the needed number of weekly readings.

Readings

First reading — Leviticus 14:1–12
In the first reading (aliyah), God told Moses the ritual for cleansing one with a skin disease. If the priest saw that the person had healed, the priest would order two live clean birds, cedar wood, crimson stuff, and hyssop. The priest would order one of the birds slaughtered over fresh water and would then dip the live bird, the cedar wood, the crimson stuff, and the hyssop in the blood of the slaughtered bird. The priest would then sprinkle the blood seven times on the one who was to be cleansed and then set the live bird free. The one to be cleansed would then wash his clothes, shave off his hair, bathe in water, and then be clean. On the eighth day after that, the one being cleansed was to present two male lambs, one ewe lamb, choice flour, and oil for the priest to offer.

Second reading — Leviticus 14:13–20
In the second reading (aliyah), the priest was to kill the lamb and put some of its blood and the oil on the ridge of the right ear, the right thumb, and the right big toe of the one being cleansed, and then put more of the oil on his head.

Third reading — Leviticus 14:21–32
In the third reading (aliyah), if the one being cleansed was poor, he could bring two turtle doves or pigeons in place of two of the lambs.

Fourth reading — Leviticus 14:33–53
In the fourth reading (aliyah), God then told Moses and Aaron the ritual for cleansing a house with an eruptive plague. The owner was to tell the priest, who was to order the house cleared and then examine it. If the plague in the walls was greenish or reddish streaks deep into the wall, the priest was to close the house for seven days. If, after seven days, the plague had spread, the priest was to order the stones with the plague to be pulled out and cast outside the city. The house was then to be scraped, the stones replaced, and the house replastered. If the plague again broke out, the house was to be torn down. If the plague did not break out again, the priest was to pronounce the house clean. To purge the house, the priest was to take two birds, cedar wood, crimson stuff, and hyssop, slaughter one bird over fresh water, sprinkle on the house seven times with the bird's blood, and then let the live bird go free.

Fifth reading — Leviticus 14:54–15:15
In the fifth reading (aliyah), God then told Moses and Aaron the ritual for cleansing a person who had a genital discharge. When a man had a discharge from his genitals, he was unclean, and any bedding on which he lay and every object on which he sat was to be unclean. Anyone who touched his body, touched his bedding, touched an object on which he sat, was touched by his spit, or was touched by him before he rinsed his hands was to wash his clothes, bathe in water, and remain unclean until evening. An earthen vessel that he touched was to be broken, and any wooden implement was to be rinsed with water. Seven days after the discharge ended, he was to wash his clothes, bathe his body in fresh water, and be clean. On the eighth day, he was to give two turtle doves or two pigeons to the priest, who was to offer them to make expiation.

Sixth reading — Leviticus 15:16–28
In the sixth reading (aliyah), when a man had an emission of semen, he was to bathe and remain unclean until evening. All material on which semen fell was to be washed in water and remain unclean until evening. And if a man had carnal relations with a woman, they were both to bathe and remain unclean until evening. When a woman had a menstrual discharge, she was to remain impure seven days, and whoever touched her was to be unclean until evening. Anything that she lay on or sat on was unclean. Anyone who touched her bedding or any object on which she has sat was to wash his clothes, bathe in water, and remain unclean until evening. And if a man lay with her, her impurity was communicated to him and he was to be unclean seven days, and any bedding on which he lay became unclean. When a woman had an irregular discharge of blood, she was to be unclean as long as her discharge lasted. Seven days after the discharge ended, she was to be clean.

Seventh reading — Leviticus 15:29–33
In the seventh reading (aliyah), on the eighth day, the woman was to give two turtle doves or two pigeons to the priest, who was to offer them to make expiation. God told Moses and Aaron to put the Israelites on guard against uncleanness, lest they die by defiling God's Tabernacle.

In inner-biblical interpretation
The parashah has parallels or is discussed in these Biblical sources:

Leviticus chapter 14
 associates skin disease with uncleanness, and  associates various sexuality-related events with uncleanness. And perhaps similarly,  associates it with childbirth and  associates it with skin disease.  associates it with various sexuality-related events.

The Hebrew Bible reports skin disease (tzara'at) and a person affected by skin disease (metzora) at several places, often (and sometimes incorrectly) translated as "leprosy" and "a leper." In  to help Moses to convince others that God had sent him, God instructed Moses to put his hand into his bosom, and when he took it out, his hand was "leprous (m'tzora'at), as white as snow." In  the Torah sets out regulations for skin diseases (tzara'at) and a person affected by skin disease (metzora). In  after Miriam spoke against Moses, God's cloud removed from the Tent of Meeting and "Miriam was leprous (m'tzora'at), as white as snow." In  Moses warned the Israelites in the case of skin disease (tzara'at) diligently to observe all that the priests would teach them, remembering what God did to Miriam. In 2 Kings  part of the haftarah for parashah Tazria, the prophet Elisha cures Naaman, the commander of the army of the king of Aram, who was a "leper" (metzora). In  part of the haftarah for parashah Metzora, the story is told of four "leprous men" (m'tzora'im) at the gate during the Arameans' siege of Samaria. And in 2 Chronicles  after King Uzziah tried to burn incense in the Temple in Jerusalem, "leprosy (tzara'at) broke forth on his forehead."

The Torah mentions the combination of ear, thumb, and toe in three places. In  God instructed Moses how to initiate the priests, telling him to kill a ram, take some of its blood, and put it on the tip of the right ear of Aaron and his sons, on the thumb of their right hand, and on the great toe of their right foot, and dash the remaining blood against the altar round about. And then  reports that Moses followed God's instructions to initiate Aaron and his sons. Then,  17, 25, and 28 set forth a similar procedure for the cleansing of a person with skin disease (tzara'at). In  God instructed the priest on the day of the person's cleansing to take some of the blood of a guilt-offering and put it upon the tip of the right ear, the thumb of the right hand, and the great toe of the right foot of the one to be cleansed. And then in  God instructed the priest to put oil on the tip of the right ear, the thumb of the right hand, and the great toe of the right foot of the one to be cleansed, on top of the blood of the guilt-offering.

In early nonrabbinic interpretation
The parashah has parallels or is discussed in these early nonrabbinic sources:

Leviticus chapter 14
Philo taught that the skin disease in  signified voluntary depravity.

In classical rabbinic interpretation
The parashah is discussed in these rabbinic sources from the era of the Mishnah and the Talmud:

Leviticus chapter 14
Tractate Negaim in the Mishnah and Tosefta interpreted the laws of skin disease in 

 calls on the Israelites to obey God's "statutes" (chukim) and "ordinances" (mishpatim). The Rabbis in a Baraita taught that the "ordinances" (mishpatim) were commandments that logic would have dictated that we follow even had Scripture not commanded them, like the laws concerning idolatry, adultery, bloodshed, robbery, and blasphemy. So that people do not think these "ordinances" (mishpatim) to be empty acts, in  God says, "I am the Lord," indicating that the Lord made these statutes, and we have no right to question them.

The Midrash noted that many things appear lowly, but God commanded many precepts to be performed with them.

Rabbi Johanan said in the name of Rabbi Joseph ben Zimra that anyone who bears evil tales (lashon hara) will be visited by the plague of skin disease (tzara’at), as it is said in Psalm  "Whoever slanders his neighbor in secret, him will I destroy (azmit)." And Resh Lakish interpreted the words of  "This shall be the law of the person with skin disease (metzora)," to mean, "This shall be the law for him who brings up an evil name (motzi shem ra)." And the Gemara reported that in the Land of Israel they taught that slander kills three persons: the slanderer, the one who accepts it, and the one about whom the slander is told.

Similarly, Rabbi Haninah taught that skin disease came only from slander. The Rabbis found a proof for this from the case of Miriam, arguing that because she uttered slander against Moses, plagues attacked her. And the Rabbis read  to support this when it says in connection with skin disease, "remember what the Lord your God did to Miriam."

Rabbi Samuel bar Nahmani said in the name of Rabbi Johanan that skin disease results from seven things: slander, the shedding of blood, vain oath, incest, arrogance, robbery, and envy. The Gemara cited scriptural bases for each of the associations: For slander,  for bloodshed, 2 Samuel  for a vain oath,  for incest,  for arrogance, 2 Chronicles  for robbery,  (as a Tanna taught that those who collect money that does not belong to them will see a priest come and scatter their money around the street); and for envy, 

Similarly, a Midrash taught that skin disease resulted from 10 sins: (1) idol-worship, (2) unchastity, (3) bloodshed, (4) the profanation of the Divine Name, (5) blasphemy of the Divine Name, (6) robbing the public, (7) usurping a dignity to which one has no right, (8) overweening pride, (9) evil speech, and (10) an evil eye.

Similarly, Rabbi Judah the Levite, son of Rabbi Shalom, inferred that skin disease comes because of eleven sins: (1) for cursing the Divine Name, (2) for immorality, (3) for bloodshed, (4) for ascribing to another a fault that is not in him, (5) for haughtiness, (6) for encroaching upon other people's domains, (7) for a lying tongue, (8) for theft, (9) for swearing falsely, (10) for profanation of the name of Heaven, and (11) for idolatry. Rabbi Isaac added: for ill-will. And our Rabbis said: for despising the words of the Torah.

It was taught in a Baraita that four types of people are accounted as though they were dead: a poor person, a person affected by skin disease (metzora), a blind person, and one who is childless. A poor person is accounted as dead, for  says, "for all the men are dead who sought your life" (and the Gemara interpreted this to mean that they had been stricken with poverty). A person affected by skin disease (metzora) is accounted as dead, for  says, "And Aaron looked upon Miriam, and behold, she was leprous (metzora'at). And Aaron said to Moses . . . let her not be as one dead." The blind are accounted as dead, for  says, "He has set me in dark places, as they that be dead of old." And one who is childless is accounted as dead, for in  Rachel said, "Give me children, or else I am dead."

A Midrash taught that Divine Justice first attacks a person's substance and then the person's body. So when leprous plagues come upon a person, first they come upon the fabric of the person's house. If the person repents, then  requires that only the affected stones need to be pulled out; if the person does not repent, then  requires pulling down the house. Then the plagues come upon the person's clothes. If the person repents, then the clothes require washing; if not, they require burning. Then the plagues come upon the person's body. If the person repents,  provides for purification; if not, then  ordains that the person "shall dwell alone."

Similarly, the Tosefta reported that when a person would come to the priest, the priest would tell the person to engage in self-examination and turn from evil ways. The priest would continue that plagues come only from gossip, and skin disease from arrogance. But God would judge in mercy. The plague would come to the house, and if the homeowner repented, the house required only dismantling, but if the homeowner did not repent, the house required demolition. They would appear on clothing, and if the owner repented, the clothing required only tearing, but if the owner did not repent, the clothing required burning. They would appear on the person's body, and if the person repented, well and good, but if the person did not repent,  required that the person "shall dwell alone."

In the priest's examination of skin disease mandated by  9, and  the Mishnah taught that a priest could examine anyone else's symptoms, but not his own. And Rabbi Meir taught that the priest could not examine his relatives. The Mishnah taught that anyone could inspect skin disease, but only a priest could declare it unclean or clean. The Mishnah taught that the priests delayed examining a bridegroom — as well as his house and his garment — until after his seven days of rejoicing, and delayed examining anyone until after a holy day.

Rabbi Joshua ben Levi taught that  required "two living clean birds" to be brought to purify the person afflicted with skin disease because the afflicted person did the work of a babbler in spreading evil tales, and therefore  required that the afflicted person offer babbling birds as a sacrifice.</ref>

The Gemara interpreted the expression "two living birds" in  The Gemara interpreted the word "living" to mean those whose principal limbs are living (excluding birds that are missing a limb) and to exclude treifah birds (birds with an injury or defect that would prevent them from living out a year). The Gemara interpreted the word "birds" (zipparim) to mean kosher birds. The Gemara deduced from the words of  "Every bird (zippor) that is clean you may eat," that some zipparim are forbidden as unclean — namely, birds slaughtered pursuant to  The Gemara interpreted the words of  "And these are they of which you shall not eat," to refer to birds slaughtered pursuant to  And the Gemara taught that  repeats the commandment so as to teach that one who consumes a bird slaughtered pursuant to  infringes both a positive and a negative commandment.

Rabbi Isaac taught that God told Noah that just as a pair of birds (ken) cleansed a person with skin disease (as instructed in ), so Noah's Ark would cleanse Noah (so that he would be worthy to be saved from the Flood).

Solomon asked why the person stricken with skin disease was purified by means of the tallest and lowest of trees. And Solomon answered that the person's raising himself up like a cedar caused him to be smitten with skin disease, but making himself small and humbling himself like the hyssop caused him be healed.

When Rabin came, he said in the name of Rabbi Jonathan that the thread in connection with the red cow weighed ten zuz, that of the goat for Azazel weighed two selas, and that of the person with skin disease weighed a shekel. Rabbi Johanan said that Rabbi Simeon ben Halafta and the Sages disagreed about the thread of the red cow, one saying that it weighed ten shekels, the other that it weighed one shekel. Rabbi Jeremiah of Difti said to Rabina that they disagreed not about the thread of the red cow, but about that of the goat for Azazel.

The Gemara taught that there were three who were required to cut their hair, and whose hair cutting was a religious duty: nazirites (as stated in ), those afflicted with skin disease (metzora, as stated in ), and the Levites. Citing the Mishnah, the Gemara taught that if any of them cut their hair without a razor, or left behind two hairs, their act was invalid.

   and  provided that people of lesser means could bring less-expensive offerings. The Mishnah taught that one who sacrificed much and one who sacrificed little attained equal merit, so long as they directed their hearts to Heaven. Rabbi Zera taught that  provided a Scriptural proof for this when it says, "Sweet is the sleep of a serving man, whether he eat little or much." Rav Adda bar Ahavah taught that  provided a Scriptural proof for this when it says, "When goods increase, they are increased who eat them; and what advantage is there to the owner thereof." Rabbi Simeon ben Azzai taught that Scripture says of a large ox, "An offering made by fire of a sweet savor"; of a small bird, "An offering made by fire of a sweet savor"; and of a meal-offering, "An offering made by fire of a sweet savor." Rabbi Simeon ben Azzai thus taught that Scripture uses the same expression each time to teach that it is the same whether people offered much or little, so long as they directed their hearts to Heaven. Rabbi Isaac taught that  uses the word "soul" (nefesh) because God noted that the one who usually brought a meal-offering was a poor man, and God accounted it as if the poor man had offered his own soul.

The Sifra noted that  says both, "if he be poor," and "his means do not suffice." The Sifra explained that reading "if he be poor," one might think that the verse allowed a less expensive offering for one who was relatively poorer that earlier, as in the case of one who earlier had 100 manehs and now had 50 manehs. Thus  also says, "his means do not suffice" (as an absolute matter).

The Mishnah taught that they buried the bird offerings of the metzora.

In a Baraita, Rabbi Jose related that a certain Elder from Jerusalem told him that 24 types of patients are afflicted with boils. The Gemara then related that Rabbi Joḥanan warned to be careful of the flies found on those afflicted with the disease ra’atan, as flies carried the disease. Rabbi Zeira would not sit in a spot where the wind blew from the direction of someone afflicted with ra’atan. Rabbi Elazar would not enter the tent of one afflicted with ra’atan, and Rabbi Ami and Rabbi Asi would not eat eggs from an alley in which someone afflicted with ra’atan lived. Rabbi Joshua ben Levi, however, would attach himself to those afflicted with ra’atan and study Torah, saying this was justified by  “The Torah is a loving hind and a graceful doe.” Rabbi Joshua reasoned that if Torah bestows grace on those who learn it, it could protect them from illness. When Rabbi Joshua ben Levi was on the verge of dying, the Gemara told, the Angel of Death was instructed to perform Rabbi Joshua's bidding, as he was a righteous man and deserves to die in the manner he saw fit. Rabbi Joshua ben Levi asked the Angel of Death to show him his place in paradise, and the Angel agreed. Rabbi Joshua ben Levi asked the Angel to give him the knife that the Angel used to kill people, lest the Angel frighten him on the way, and the Angel gave it to him. When they arrived in paradise, the Angel lifted Rabbi Joshua so that he could see his place in paradise, and Rabbi Joshua jumped to the other side, escaping into paradise. Elijah the Prophet then told those in paradise to make way for Rabbi Joshua.

The Gemara told that Rabbi Joshua ben Levi asked Elijah when the Messiah would come, and Elijah told Rabbi Joshua ben Levi that he could find the Messiah sitting at the entrance of the city of Rome among the poor who suffer from illnesses.

In  God announced that God would "put the plague of leprosy in a house of the land of your possession." Rabbi Hiyya asked: Was it then a piece of good news that plagues were to come upon them? Rabbi Simeon ben Yohai answered that when the Canaanites heard that the Israelites were approaching, they hid their valuables in their houses. But God promised the Israelites' forbearers that God would bring the Israelites into a land full of good things, including (in the words of ) "houses full of all good things." So God brought plagues upon a house of one of the Israelites so that when he would pull it down, he would find a treasure.

Reading  and  a Midrash taught that in 18 verses, Scripture places Moses and Aaron (the instruments of Israel's deliverance) on an equal footing (reporting that God spoke to both of them alike), and thus there are 18 benedictions in the Amidah.

Thus house plagues could occur only in the Land of Israel west of the Jordan.

Because  addresses "a house of the land," the Mishnah taught that a house built on a ship, on a raft, or on four beams could not be afflicted by a house plague.

The Midrash read  to read, "and they were taken in possession by it." The Midrash thus taught that in the case of Goshen, the land seized the Israelites, so that their bond might be exacted and so as to bring about God's declaration to Abraham in  that the Egyptians would afflict the Israelites for 400 years. But the Midrash read  to teach the Israelites that if they were worthy, the Land of Israel would be an eternal possession, but if not, they would be banished from it.

The Rabbis taught that a structure of less than four square cubits could not contract a house plague. The Gemara explained that in speaking of house plagues,  uses the word "house," and a building of less than four square cubits did not constitute a "house."

A Baraita (which the Gemara later said may have reflected the view of Rabbi Meir, or may have reflected the view of the Rabbis) taught that a synagogue, a house owned by partners, and a house owned by a woman are all subject to uncleanness from house plagues. The Gemara explained that the Baraita needed to expound this because one might have argued that  says, "then he who owns the house shall come and tell the priest," and "he who owns the house" could be read to imply "he" but not "she" and "he" but not "they." And therefore the Baraita teaches that one should not read  that narrowly. And the Gemara explained that one should not read  that narrowly because  speaks broadly of "a house of the land of your possession," indicating that all houses in the Land of Israel are susceptible to plagues. The Gemara then asked why  bothers to say, "he who owns the house." The Gemara explained that  intends to teach that if a homeowner keeps his house to himself exclusively, refusing to lend his belongings, pretending that he did not own them, then God exposes the homeowner by subjecting his house to the plague and causing his belongings to be removed for all to see (as  requires). Thus  excludes from the infliction of house plagues homeowners who lend their belongings to others.

Similarly, Rabbi Isaac taught that when a person asked to borrow a friend's ax or sieve, and the friend out of selfishness replied that he did not have one, then immediately the plague would attack the friend's house. And as  required that they remove everything that he had in his house, including his axes and his sieves, the people would see his possessions and exclaim how selfish he had been.

But the Gemara asked whether a synagogue could be subject to house plagues. For a Baraita (which the Gemara later identified with the view of the Rabbis) taught that one might assume that synagogues and houses of learning are subject to house plagues, and therefore  says, "he who has the house will come," to exclude those houses — like synagogues — that do not belong to any one individual. The Gemara proposed a resolution to the conflict by explaining that the first Baraita reflected the opinion of Rabbi Meir, while the second Baraita reflected the opinion of the Rabbis. For a Baraita taught that a synagogue that contains a dwelling for the synagogue attendant is required to have a mezuzah, but a synagogue that contains no dwelling, Rabbi Meir declares it is required to have a mezuzah, but the Sages exempt it.

Alternatively, the Gemara suggested that both teachings were in accord with the Rabbis. In the first case, the synagogue referred to has a dwelling, and then even the Rabbis would say that it would be subject to house plagues. In the other case, the synagogue referred to has no dwelling, and so would not be subject to house plagues.

Alternatively, the Gemara tentatively suggested that in both cases, the synagogue has no dwelling, but the first teaching refers to urban synagogues, while the second refers to rural synagogues. But the Gemara asked whether urban synagogues really are not subject to uncleanness from house plagues. For a Baraita taught that the words, "in the house of the land of your possession" in  teach that a house of the land of the Israelites' possession could become defiled through house plagues, but Jerusalem could not become defiled through house plagues, because Jerusalem did not fall within any single Tribe's inheritance. Rabbi Judah, however, said that he had heard that only the Temple in Jerusalem was unaffected by house plagues. Thus Rabbi Judah's view would imply that synagogues and houses of learning are subject to house plagues even in large cities. The Gemara suggested, however, that one should read Rabbi Judah's view to say that sacred places are not subject to house plagues. The Gemara suggested that the principle that the first Tanna and Rabbi Judah were disputing was whether Jerusalem was divided among the Tribes; the first Tanna holds that Jerusalem was not divided, while Rabbi Judah holds that Jerusalem was divided among the Tribes.

But the Gemara asked whether even rural synagogues could be subject to house plagues. For a Baraita taught that the words, "in the house of the land of your possession" in  teach that house plagues would not affect the Israelites until they conquered the Land of Israel. Furthermore, if the Israelites had conquered the Land but not yet divided it among the Tribes, or even divided it among the Tribes but not divided it among the families, or even divided it among the families but not given each person his holding, then house plagues would not yet affect the Israelites. It is to teach this result that  says, "he who has the house," teaching that house plagues can occur only to those in the Land of Israel to whom alone the house belongs, excluding these houses that do not belong to an owner alone. Thus the Gemara rejected the explanation based on differences between urban and rural synagogues.

Rather, even the sage must say, "there seems to me to be as it were a plague in the house."

The Mishnah interpreted the instruction to empty the house in  Rabbi Judah taught that they removed even bundles of wood and even bundles of reeds. Rabbi Simeon remarked that this (removal of bundles that are not susceptible to uncleanness) was idle business. But Rabbi Meir responded by asking which of the homeowner's goods could become unclean. Articles of wood, cloth, or metal surely could be immersed in a ritual bath and become clean. The only thing that the Torah spared was the homeowner's earthenware, even his  and his ewer (which, if the house proved unclean,  indicates would have to be broken). If the Torah thus spared a person's humble possessions, how much more so would the Torah spare a person's cherished possessions. If the Torah shows so much consideration for material possessions, how much more so would the Torah show for the lives of a person's children. If the Torah shows so much consideration for the possessions of a wicked person (if we take the plague as a punishment for the sin of slander), how much more so would the Torah show for the possessions of a righteous person.

Reading  to say, "And he shall look on the plague, and behold the plague," the Sifra interpreted the double allusion to teach that a sign of house plague was no cause of uncleanness unless it appeared in at least the size of two split beans. And because  addresses the house's "walls" in the plural, the Sifra taught that a sign of house plague was no cause of uncleanness unless it appeared on at least four walls. Consequently, the Mishnah taught that a round house or a triangular house could not contract uncleanness from a house plague.

Because  addresses the house's "stones" in the plural, Rabbi Akiva ruled that a sign of house plague was no cause of uncleanness unless it appeared in at least the size of two split beans on two stones, and not on only one stone. And because  addresses the house's "walls" in the plural, Rabbi Eliezer son of Rabbi Simeon said that a sign of house plague was no cause of uncleanness unless it appeared in the size of two split beans, on two stones, on two walls in a corner, its length being that of two split beans and its breadth that of one split bean.

Because  addresses the "stones," "timber," and "mortar" of the house afflicted by a house plague, the Mishnah taught that only a house made of stones, timber, and mortar could be afflicted by a house plague. And the Mishnah taught that the quantity of wood must be enough to build a threshold, and quantity of mortar must be enough to fill up the space between one row of stones and another.

The Gemara asked why then the law was written, and replied that it was so that one may study it and receive reward. But Rabbi Eliezer the son of Rabbi Zadok and Rabbi Simeon of Kefar Acco both cited cases where local tradition reported the ruins of such houses, in Gaza and Galilee, respectively.

Leviticus chapter 15
Tractate Zavim in the Mishnah and Tosefta interpreted the laws of male genital discharges in 

The Mishnah taught that they inquired along seven lines before they determined that a genital discharge rendered a man unclean. A discharge caused by one of these reasons did not render the man impure or subject him to bringing an offering. They asked: (1) about his food, (2) about his drink, (3) what he had carried, (4) whether he had jumped, (5) whether he had been ill, (6) what he had seen, and (7) whether he had obscene thoughts. It did not matter whether he had had thoughts before or after seeing a woman. Rabbi Judah taught that the discharge would not render him unclean if he had watched animals having intercourse or even if he merely saw a woman's dyed garments. Rabbi Akiva taught that the discharge would not render him unclean even if he had eaten any kind of food, good or bad, or had drunk any kind of liquid. The Sages exclaimed to Rabbi Akiva that according to his view, no more men would ever be rendered unclean by genital discharge. Rabbi Akiva replied that one does not have an obligation to ensure that there exist men unclean because of a genital discharges.

Tractate Niddah in the Mishnah, Tosefta, Jerusalem Talmud, and Babylonian Talmud interpreted the laws of menstruation in 

Rabbi Meir taught that the Torah ordained that menstruation should separate a wife from her husband for seven days, because if the husband were in constant contact with his wife, the husband might become disenchanted with her. The Torah, therefore, ordained that a wife might be unclean for seven days (and therefore forbidden to her husband for marital relations) so that she should become as desirable to her husband as when she first entered the bridal chamber.

The Mishnah taught that all women are presumed clean for their husbands (and for the purpose of marital relations, no examination is required). The Mishnah taught that it is also true for men who return from a journey that their wives are presumed clean.

Interpreting the beginning of menstrual cycles, as in  the Mishnah ruled that if a woman loses track of her menstrual cycle, there is no return to the beginning of the niddah count in fewer than seven, nor more than seventeen days.</ref>

The Mishnah taught that a woman may attribute a bloodstain to any external cause to which she can possibly attribute it and thus regard herself as clean. If, for instance, she had killed an animal, she was handling bloodstains, she had sat beside those who handled bloodstains, or she had killed a louse, she may attribute the stain to those external causes.

The Mishnah related that a woman once came to Rabbi Akiva and told him that she had observed a bloodstain. He asked her whether she perhaps had a wound. She replied that she had a wound, but it had healed. He asked whether it was possible that it could open again and bleed. She answered in the affirmative, and Rabbi Akiva declared her clean. Observing that his disciples looked at each other in astonishment, he told them that the Sages did not lay down the rule for bloodstains to create a strict result but rather to produce a lenient result, for  says, "If a woman has an issue, and her issue in her flesh is blood" — only blood, not a bloodstain.

Tractate Mikvaot in the Mishnah and Tosefta interpreted the laws of the ritual bath (mikveh) prescribed for the cleansing of menstruants in 

The Mishnah taught that there are six grades of ritual baths, each higher than the other. The first is rainwater in a water hole. Superior to that is the water of rain drippings that have not stopped. Superior to that is the water of a mikveh containing 40 se'ahs of water, for in such a mikveh persons may immerse themselves and immerse others. Superior to that is the water of a fountain whose own water is little but has been increased by a greater quantity of drawn water. Superior to that are salty or hot waters from a spring, which can render clean when flowing. And superior to that are living waters, which serve for the immersion of persons who have a running issue and for the sprinkling of persons with skin disease, and are valid for the preparation of the water of purification.

The Mishnah taught that any pool of water that mingles with the water of a mikveh is as valid as the mikveh itself. The Mishnah taught that one may immerse in holes and crevices of a cavern just as they are, but one may not immerse in the pit of a cavern except if it has an opening as big as the tube of a water skin. Rabbi Judah taught that this is the case when it stands by itself (and forms an independent pool separated by a wall from the pool in the cavern), but if it does not stand by itself, one may immerse in it just as it is (for it is part of the pool in the cavern).

In medieval Jewish interpretation
The parashah is discussed in these medieval Jewish sources:

Leviticus chapter 14
Rashi reported an interpretation by Rabbi Moshe ha-Darshan (the preacher) that since the Levites were submitted in atonement for the firstborn who had practiced idolatry when they worshipped the Golden Calf (in ), and  calls idol worship "sacrifices to the dead," and in  Moses called one afflicted with skin disease (tzara'at) "as one dead," and  required those afflicted with skin disease to shave, therefore God required the Levites too to shave.

In modern interpretation
The parashah is discussed in these modern sources:

Leviticus chapter 14
Professor Ephraim Speiser of the University of Pennsylvania in the mid 20th century wrote that the word “Torah” is based on a verbal stem signifying “to teach, guide,” and the like, and the derived noun can carry a variety of meanings, including in   54, and 57, specific rituals for what is sometimes called leprosy. Speiser argued that in context, the word cannot be mistaken for the title of the Pentateuch as a whole.

Professor Jacob Milgrom, formerly of the University of California, Berkeley, noted that reddish substances, surrogates for blood, were among the ingredients of the purificatory rites for scale-diseased and corpse-contaminated persons, symbolizing the victory of the forces of life over death.

Leviticus chapter 15
Dr. Elaine Goodfriend of California State University, Northridge, argued that the regulations of menstruation in  probably had a smaller practical impact on women in ancient Israel than one might imagine, as women at that time probably menstruated less frequently than modern women due to sparser diet, more-frequent pregnancies, and longer breast-feeding (typically three years), all of which would have reduced their number of menstrual cycles.

Commandments
According to the Sefer ha-Chinuch, there are 11 positive and no negative commandments in the parashah:
To carry out the prescribed rules for purifying the person affected by skin disease (tzara'at)
The person affected by skin disease (tzara'at) must shave off all his hair prior to purification.
Every impure person must immerse in a mikveh to become pure.
A person affected by skin disease (tzara'at) must bring an offering after going to the mikveh.
To observe the laws of impurity caused by a house's , tzara'at
To observe the laws of impurity caused by a man's running issue
A man who had a running issue must bring an offering after he goes to the mikveh.
To observe the laws of impurity of a seminal emission
To observe the laws of menstrual impurity
To observe the laws of impurity caused by a woman's running issue
A woman who had a running issue must bring an offering after she goes to the mikveh.

In the liturgy

The laws of a house afflicted with plague in  provide an application of the twelfth of the Thirteen Rules for interpreting the Torah in the Baraita of Rabbi Ishmael that many Jews read as part of the readings before the Pesukei d'Zimrah prayer service. The twelfth rule provides that one may elucidate a matter from its context or from a passage following it.  describes the laws of the house afflicted with plague generally. But because  instructs what to do with the "stones ... timber ... and all the mortar of the house," the Rabbis interpret the laws of the house afflicted with plague to apply only to houses made of stones, timber, and mortar.

Haftarah
The haftarah for the parashah is

Summary
During the Arameans' siege of Samaria, four leprous men at the gate asked each other why they should die there of starvation, when they might go to the Arameans, who would either save them or leave them no worse than they were. When at twilight, they went to the Arameans' camp, there was no one there, for God had made the Arameans hear chariots, horses, and a great army, and fearing the Hittites and the Egyptians, they fled, leaving their tents, their horses, their donkeys, and their camp. The lepers went into a tent, ate and drank, and carried away silver, gold, and clothing from the tents and hid it.

Feeling qualms of guilt, they went to go tell the king of Samaria, and called to the porters of the city telling them what they had seen, and the porters told the king's household within. The king arose in the night, and told his servants that he suspected that the Arameans had hidden in the field, thinking that when the Samaritans came out, they would be able to get into the city. One of his servants suggested that some men take five of the horses that remained and go see, and they took two chariots with horses to go and see. They went after the Arameans as far as the Jordan River, and all the way was littered with garments and vessels that the Arameans had cast away in their haste, and the messengers returned and told the king. So the people went out and looted Arameans' camp, so that the market price of; a measure (seah) of fine flour (about six dry qt., six lb. or three kg.) and two seahs of barley meal; each dropped to one shekel in price, as God's prophet had said it would. And the king appointed the captain on whom he leaned to take charge of the gate, and the people trampled him and killed him before he could taste of the flour, just as the man of God Elisha had said.

Connection to the parashah
Both the parashah and the haftarah deal with people stricken with skin disease. Both the parashah and the haftarah employ the term for the person affected by skin disease (metzora). Just before parashah Metzora, in the sister parashah Tazria,  provides that the person with skin disease "shall dwell alone; without the camp shall his dwelling be," thus explaining why the four leprous men in the haftarah lived outside the gate.

In the parashah, when there "seems" to be a plague in the house, the priest must not jump to conclusions, but must examine the facts.

The haftarah in classical rabbinic interpretation
Reading  "Now there were four leprous men at the entrance of the gate; and they said one to another: 'Why do we sit here until we die? If we say: "We will enter into the city," then the famine is in the city, and we shall die there; and if we sit still here, we die also. Now therefore come, and let us go to the host of the Arameans; if they save us alive, we shall live; and if they kill us, we shall but die,’" and  "And there was a famine in the land; and Abram went down into Egypt to sojourn there," the Rabbis deduced that when there is a famine a place, one should migrate elsewhere. And the Gemara taught that the Rabbis cited  in addition to  because one might think from  that this advice applies only where there is no danger to life in the destination. So they also cited  "Now therefore come, and let us go to the host of the Arameans; if they save us alive, we shall live."

The haftarah in modern interpretation
Professor Choon-Leong Seow of Vanderbilt University noted that lepers, outcasts of society, discovered that the Arameans had deserted their camp, and it was through them that the news came to the Israelites, while those in power doubted divine deliverance. And while the faithless king did not accept the news, a nameless servant provided a solution that led to the fulfillment of prophecy. Thus, God brought about salvation for the Israelites through the outcasts and the lowly of society.

On Shabbat HaGadol
When the parashah coincides with Shabbat HaGadol (the "Great Shabbat," the special Sabbath immediately before Passover — as it does in 2019, 2022, 2024, and 2027), the haftarah is

On Shabbat HaChodesh
When the parashah coincides with Shabbat HaChodesh ("Sabbath [of] the month," the special Sabbath preceding the Hebrew month of Nissan — as it did in 2008), the haftarah is:

for Ashkenazi Jews: 
for Sephardi Jews:

Connection to the special Sabbath
On Shabbat HaChodesh, Jews read  in which God commands that "This month [Nissan] shall be the beginning of months; it shall be the first month of the year," and in which God issued the commandments of Passover. Similarly, the haftarah in  discusses Passover. In both the special reading and the haftarah, God instructs the Israelites to apply blood to doorposts.

On Shabbat Rosh Chodesh
When the parashah coincides with Shabbat Rosh Chodesh (as it did in 2009), the haftarah is

Notes

Further reading
The parashah has parallels or is discussed in these sources:

Biblical
 (hyssop).
 (right ear, thumb of right hand, and great toe of right foot);  20–22 (riddance ritual).
 (cedar wood, hyssop, and red stuff);  (hyssop).
 (priests' duty to assess);  (priests' duties regarding skin diseases).
 (purification from skin disease with living water);  (people with skin disease).
 (transporting away wickedness by wing).

 ("Purge me with hyssop");  (to teach);  (plague on dwelling);  (learning from the law).

Early nonrabbinic
Philo. Allegorical Interpretation 3:4:15; That the Worse Is Wont To Attack the Better 6:16; On the Unchangeableness of God 28:131–35. Alexandria, Egypt, early 1st century CE. In, e.g., The Works of Philo: Complete and Unabridged, New Updated Edition. Translated by Charles Duke Yonge, pages 51, 113, 169. Peabody, Massachusetts: Hendrickson Publishers, 1993.
Josephus, Antiquities of the Jews 3:11:3–4. Circa 93–94. In, e.g., The Works of Josephus: Complete and Unabridged, New Updated Edition. Translated by William Whiston, pages 96–97. Peabody, Massachusetts: Hendrickson Publishers, 1987. .
Hebrews  Late 1st century. (scarlet wool and hyssop).
John  (hyssop).
Quran 2:222 (menstruation); 4:43 (bathing); 24:30 (modesty) Arabia, circa 609–632.

Classical rabbinic
Mishnah: Pesachim 8:5; Shekalim 5:3; Yoma 4:2; Moed Katan 3:1–2; Nazir 7:3; Avot 3:18; Horayot 1:3; Zevachim 4:3; Menachot 5:6–7, 9:3, 13:11; Bekhorot 7:2; Arakhin 2:1; Temurah 7:4; Kinnim 1:1–3:6; Negaim 1:1–14:13; Parah 1:4, 6:5; Mikvaot 1:1–10:8; Mikvaot 1:1–10:8; Niddah 1:1–10:8; Zavim 1:1–5:12. Land of Israel, circa 200 CE. In, e.g., The Mishnah: A New Translation. Translated by Jacob Neusner, pages 245, 259, 270–71, 327, 443–44, 690, 681, 706, 743, 751, 765, 801, 811, 835, 883–89, 981–1012, 1014, 1021, 1058–95, 1108–17. New Haven: Yale University Press, 1988. .
Tosefta: Demai 2:7; Challah 2:7; Sotah 1:8; Menachot 7:16, 10:1; Chullin 10:14; Negaim 1:1–9:9; Niddah 1:1–9:19; Mikvaot 1:1–7:11; Zavim 1:1–5:12. Land of Israel, circa 250 CE. In, e.g., The Tosefta: Translated from the Hebrew, with a New Introduction. Translated by Jacob Neusner, volume 1, pages 85, 339, 835; volume 2, pages 1404, 1438, 1450, 1709–44, 1779–835, 1887–99. Peabody, Massachusetts: Hendrickson Publishers, 2002. .
Sifra 148:1–173:9. Land of Israel, 4th century CE. In, e.g., Sifra: An Analytical Translation. Translated by Jacob Neusner, volume 2, pages 325–429. Atlanta: Scholars Press, 1988. .
Jerusalem Talmud: Orlah 6a, 39a; Shabbat 10b, 73a; Pesachim 37a; Yoma 16b, 41b; Megillah 11b–12a; Yevamot 69a; Nazir 35a, 52a; Sotah 10a–b, 11b; Gittin 53b; Kiddushin 11a; Sanhedrin 22b; Niddah 1a–. Tiberias, Land of Israel, circa 400 CE. In, e.g., Talmud Yerushalmi. Edited by Chaim Malinowitz, Yisroel Simcha Schorr, and Mordechai Marcus, volumes 12–14, 18, 21, 26, 30, 35–36, 39–40, 44. Brooklyn: Mesorah Publications, 2007–2017. And reprinted in, e.g., The Jerusalem Talmud: A Translation and Commentary. Edited by Jacob Neusner and translated by Jacob Neusner, Tzvee Zahavy, B. Barry Levy, and Edward Goldman. Peabody, Massachusetts: Hendrickson Publishers, 2009.
Mekhilta of Rabbi Simeon 13:1; 57:3; 59:3. Land of Israel, 5th century. In, e.g., Mekhilta de-Rabbi Shimon bar Yohai. Translated by W. David Nelson, pages 43, 258, 268. Philadelphia: Jewish Publication Society, 2006. .
Leviticus Rabbah 16:1–19:6; 34:6. Land of Israel, 5th century. In, e.g., Midrash Rabbah: Leviticus. Translated by Harry Freedman and Maurice Simon, volume 4, pages 199–249, 431. London: Soncino Press, 1939. .

Babylonian Talmud: Shabbat 2b, 11b, 59a, 62b, 64a–b, 71b, 83a, 84a–b, 86b, 109a, 132a; Eruvin 4a–b, 14b, 51a, 82b; Pesachim 3a, 24a, 59a–b, 65b, 67b–68a, 85b, 90b, 92a, 109a; Yoma 5a, 6a, 11b–12a, 24a, 30b–31a, 41b, 61a–b, 62b, 63a; Sukkah 3a–b, 5b–6a; Beitzah 32a; Taanit 26b; Megillah 8a–b, 20a–21a, 26a; Moed Katan 5a, 7a–b, 13b, 14b, 15a–16a, 17b, 25b, 27b; Chagigah 9b, 11a, 23b; Yevamot 5a, 7a, 17b, 34b, 46b, 49b, 54a, 69b, 73a, 102b, 103b–04a, 105a; Ketubot 61b, 64b, 72a, 75a; Nedarim 35b–36a, 56a–b; Nazir 3b, 5a, 8b, 15b, 25b, 27a, 29a, 38a, 39b, 40b–41a, 43a, 44a–b, 46b, 47b, 54a–b, 56a–b, 57b–58a, 60a–b, 65b–66a; Sotah 5b, 8a, 15b–16b, 29b; Gittin 46a, 82a; Kiddushin 15a, 25a, 33b, 56b–57b, 68a, 70b; Bava Kamma 17b, 24a, 25a–b, 66b, 82a–b; Bava Metzia 31a; Bava Batra 9b, 24a, 164b, 166a; Sanhedrin 45b, 48b, 71a, 87b–88a, 92a; Makkot 13b, 21a; Shevuot 6a–b, 8a, 11a, 14b, 17b, 18a–b; Avodah Zarah 34a, 47b, 74a; Horayot 3b–4a, 8b, 10a; Zevachim 6b, 8a, 17b, 24b, 32b, 40a, 43a, 44a–b, 47b, 49a, 54b, 76b, 90b, 91b, 105a, 112b; Menachot 3a, 5a, 8a, 9a–10a, 15b, 18b, 24a, 27a–b, 35b, 42b, 48b, 61a, 64b, 73a, 76b, 86b, 88a, 89a, 91a, 101b, 106b; Chullin 10b, 24b, 27a, 35a, 49b, 51b, 62a, 71b, 72b, 82a, 85a, 106a, 123b, 128b, 133a, 140a, 141a, 142a; Bekhorot 32a, 38a, 45b; Arakhin 3a, 8a, 15b–17b; Keritot 8a–b, 9b, 10b, 25a, 28a; Meilah 11a, 18a, 19a–b; Niddah 2a–73a. Babylonia, 6th century. In, e.g., Talmud Bavli. Edited by Yisroel Simcha Schorr, Chaim Malinowitz, and Mordechai Marcus, 72 volumes. Brooklyn: Mesorah Publications, 2006.

Medieval
Exodus Rabbah 17:1. 10th century. In, e.g., Midrash Rabbah: Exodus. Translated by S. M. Lehrman, 3:211. London: Soncino Press, 1939. .
Rashi. Commentary. Leviticus 14–15. Troyes, France, late 11th century. In, e.g., Rashi. The Torah: With Rashi's Commentary Translated, Annotated, and Elucidated. Translated and annotated by Yisrael Isser Zvi Herczeg, volume 3, pages 159–90. Brooklyn: Mesorah Publications, 1994. .
Rashbam. Commentary on the Torah. Troyes, early 12th century. In, e.g., Rashbam’s Commentary on Leviticus and Numbers: An Annotated Translation. Edited and translated by Martin I. Lockshin, pages 77–85. Providence: Brown Judaic Studies, 2001. .

Judah Halevi. Kuzari. 3:53. Toledo, Spain, 1130–1140. In, e.g., Jehuda Halevi. Kuzari: An Argument for the Faith of Israel. Introduction by Henry Slonimsky, page 181. New York: Schocken, 1964. .
Abraham ibn Ezra. Commentary on the Torah. Mid-12th century. In, e.g., Ibn Ezra's Commentary on the Pentateuch: Leviticus (Va-yikra). Translated and annotated by H. Norman Strickman and Arthur M. Silver, volume 3, pages 103–20. New York: Menorah Publishing Company, 2004. .
Maimonides. The Guide for the Perplexed, part 3, chapter 47. Cairo, Egypt, 1190. In, e.g., Moses Maimonides. The Guide for the Perplexed. Translated by Michael Friedländer, pages 367–68, 370. New York: Dover Publications, 1956. .
Hezekiah ben Manoah. Hizkuni. France, circa 1240. In, e.g., Chizkiyahu ben Manoach. Chizkuni: Torah Commentary. Translated and annotated by Eliyahu Munk, volume 3, pages 729–44. Jerusalem: Ktav Publishers, 2013. .
Nachmanides. Commentary on the Torah. Jerusalem, circa 1270. In, e.g., Ramban (Nachmanides): Commentary on the Torah. Translated by Charles B. Chavel, volume 3, pages 186–209. New York: Shilo Publishing House, 1974. .

Zohar part 3, pages 52b–56a. Spain, late 13th century. In, e.g., The Zohar: Pritzker Edition. Translation and commentary by Daniel C. Matt, volume 7, pages 331–55. Stanford: Stanford University Press, 2012. .
Bahya ben Asher. Commentary on the Torah. Spain, early 14th century. In, e.g., Midrash Rabbeinu Bachya: Torah Commentary by Rabbi Bachya ben Asher. Translated and annotated by Eliyahu Munk, volume 5, pages 1653–74. Jerusalem: Lambda Publishers, 2003. .
Jacob ben Asher (Baal Ha-Turim). Rimze Ba'al ha-Turim. Early 14th century. In, e.g., Baal Haturim Chumash: Vayikra/Leviticus. Translated by Eliyahu Touger, edited, elucidated, and annotated by Avie Gold, volume 3, pages 1139–61. Brooklyn: Mesorah Publications, 2000. .
Jacob ben Asher. Perush Al ha-Torah. Early 14th century. In, e.g., Yaakov ben Asher. Tur on the Torah. Translated and annotated by Eliyahu Munk, volume 3, pages 868–76. Jerusalem: Lambda Publishers, 2005. .
Isaac ben Moses Arama. Akedat Yizhak (The Binding of Isaac). Late 15th century. In, e.g., Yitzchak Arama. Akeydat Yitzchak: Commentary of Rabbi Yitzchak Arama on the Torah. Translated and condensed by Eliyahu Munk, volume 2, pages 588–91. New York, Lambda Publishers, 2001. .

Modern
Isaac Abravanel. Commentary on the Torah. Italy, between 1492 and 1509. In, e.g., Abarbanel: Selected Commentaries on the Torah: Volume 3: Vayikra/Leviticus. Translated and annotated by Israel Lazar, pages 120–35. Brooklyn: CreateSpace, 2015. .
Obadiah ben Jacob Sforno. Commentary on the Torah. Venice, 1567. In, e.g., Sforno: Commentary on the Torah. Translation and explanatory notes by Raphael Pelcovitz, pages 550–61. Brooklyn: Mesorah Publications, 1997. .

Moshe Alshich. Commentary on the Torah. Safed, circa 1593. In, e.g., Moshe Alshich. Midrash of Rabbi Moshe Alshich on the Torah. Translated and annotated by Eliyahu Munk, volume 2, pages 668–78. New York, Lambda Publishers, 2000. .
Thomas Hobbes. Leviathan, 3:40. England, 1651. Reprint edited by C. B. Macpherson, pages 503–04. Harmondsworth, England: Penguin Classics, 1982. .
Avraham Yehoshua Heschel. Commentaries on the Torah. Cracow, Poland, mid 17th century. Compiled as Chanukat HaTorah. Edited by Chanoch Henoch Erzohn. Piotrkow, Poland, 1900. In Avraham Yehoshua Heschel. Chanukas HaTorah: Mystical Insights of Rav Avraham Yehoshua Heschel on Chumash. Translated by Avraham Peretz Friedman, pages 222–26. Southfield, Michigan: Targum Press/Feldheim Publishers, 2004. .
Shabbethai Bass. Sifsei Chachamim. Amsterdam, 1680. In, e.g., Sefer Vayikro: From the Five Books of the Torah: Chumash: Targum Okelos: Rashi: Sifsei Chachamim: Yalkut: Haftaros, translated by Avrohom Y. Davis, pages 249–97. Lakewood Township, New Jersey: Metsudah Publications, 2012.
Chaim ibn Attar. Ohr ha-Chaim. Venice, 1742. In Chayim ben Attar. Or Hachayim: Commentary on the Torah. Translated by Eliyahu Munk, volume 3, pages 1091–127. Brooklyn: Lambda Publishers, 1999. .

Yitzchak Magriso. Me'am Lo'ez. Constantinople, 1753. In Yitzchak Magriso. The Torah Anthology: MeAm Lo'ez. Translated by Aryeh Kaplan, volume 11, pages 301–28. New York: Moznaim Publishing, 1989. .
Nachman of Breslov. Teachings. Bratslav, Ukraine, before 1811. In Rebbe Nachman's Torah: Breslov Insights into the Weekly Torah Reading: Exodus-Leviticus. Compiled by Chaim Kramer, edited by Y. Hall, pages 341–45. Jerusalem: Breslov Research Institute, 2011. .
Emily Dickinson. Poem 1733 (No man saw awe, nor to his house). 19th century. In The Complete Poems of Emily Dickinson. Edited by Thomas H. Johnson, page 703. New York: Little, Brown & Co., 1960. .

Samuel David Luzzatto (Shadal). Commentary on the Torah. Padua, 1871. In, e.g., Samuel David Luzzatto. Torah Commentary. Translated and annotated by Eliyahu Munk, volume 3, pages 946–48. New York: Lambda Publishers, 2012. .
Yehudah Aryeh Leib Alter. Sefat Emet. Góra Kalwaria (Ger), Poland, before 1906. Excerpted in The Language of Truth: The Torah Commentary of Sefat Emet. Translated and interpreted by Arthur Green, pages 173–77. Philadelphia: Jewish Publication Society, 1998. . Reprinted 2012. .
Alexander Alan Steinbach. Sabbath Queen: Fifty-four Bible Talks to the Young Based on Each Portion of the Pentateuch, pages 87–90. New York: Behrman's Jewish Book House, 1936.
E.V. Hulse, "The Nature of Biblical ‘Leprosy’ and the Use of Alternative Medical Terms in Modern Translations of the Bible." Palestine Exploration Quarterly. Volume 107 (1975): pages 87–105.
Gordon J. Wenham. The Book of Leviticus, pages 203–25. Grand Rapids, Michigan: William B. Eerdmans Publishing Company, 1979. .
Helen Frenkley. "The Search for Roots—Israel's Biblical Landscape Reserve." In Biblical Archaeology Review. Volume 12 (number 5) (September/October 1986).
Walter Jacob. "Jewish Reaction to Epidemics (AIDS)." In Contemporary American Reform Responsa, pages 136–38. New York: Central Conference of American Rabbis, 1987. .
Pinchas H. Peli. Torah Today: A Renewed Encounter with Scripture, pages 127–31. Washington, D.C.: B'nai B'rith Books, 1987. .
David P. Wright. The Disposal of Impurity, pages 75–113, 163–228. Atlanta: Scholars Press, 1987. .
Blood Magic: The Anthropology of Menstruation. Edited by Thomas Buckley and Alma Gottlieb. Berkeley: University of California Press, 1988. .
Harvey J. Fields. A Torah Commentary for Our Times: Volume II: Exodus and Leviticus, pages 120–26. New York: UAHC Press, 1991. .
Jacob Milgrom. "The Rationale for Biblical Impurity." Journal of the Ancient Near Eastern Society. Volume 22 (1993): pages 107–11.
Victor Avigdor Hurowitz. "Review Essay: Ancient Israelite Cult in History, Tradition, and Interpretation." AJS Review, volume 19 (number 2) (1994): pages 213–36.
Walter C. Kaiser Jr., " The Book of Leviticus," in The New Interpreter's Bible, volume 1, pages 1086–106. Nashville: Abingdon Press, 1994. .
Judith S. Antonelli. "Menstruation." In In the Image of God: A Feminist Commentary on the Torah, pages 276–87. Northvale, New Jersey: Jason Aronson, 1995. .
Ellen Frankel. The Five Books of Miriam: A Woman’s Commentary on the Torah, pages 167–71. New York: G. P. Putnam's Sons, 1996. .

W. Gunther Plaut. The Haftarah Commentary, pages 277–84. New York: UAHC Press, 1996. .
Binyomin Forst. The Laws of Niddah: A Comprehensive Exposition of Their Underlying Concepts and Applications, volume 1. Brooklyn: Mesorah Publications, 1997. .
Judith Hauptman. “Niddah.” In Rereading the Rabbis: A Woman's Voice, pages 147–76. Boulder, Colorado: Westview Press, 1997. .
Sorel Goldberg Loeb and Barbara Binder Kadden. Teaching Torah: A Treasury of Insights and Activities, pages 189–93. Denver: A.R.E. Publishing, 1997. .
Jacob Milgrom. Leviticus 1–16, volume 3, pages 827–1009. New York: Anchor Bible, 1998. .
Laura Geller. "Reclaiming the Torah of Our Lives." In The Women's Torah Commentary: New Insights from Women Rabbis on the 54 Weekly Torah Portions. Edited by Elyse Goldstein, pages 211–17. Woodstock, Vermont: Jewish Lights Publishing, 2000. .
Frank H. Gorman Jr. "Leviticus." In The HarperCollins Bible Commentary. Edited by James L. Mays, pages 156–58. New York: HarperCollins Publishers, revised edition, 2000. .
Lainie Blum Cogan and Judy Weiss. Teaching Haftarah: Background, Insights, and Strategies, pages 200–06. Denver: A.R.E. Publishing, 2002. .
Michael Fishbane. The JPS Bible Commentary: Haftarot, pages 174–78. Philadelphia: Jewish Publication Society, 2002. .
Robert Alter. The Five Books of Moses: A Translation with Commentary, pages 599–610. New York: W.W. Norton & Co., 2004. .
Jacob Milgrom. Leviticus: A Book of Ritual and Ethics: A Continental Commentary, pages 133–61. Minneapolis: Fortress Press, 2004. .
Rochelle Robins. "Haftarat Metzorah: II Kings 7:3–20" In The Women's Haftarah Commentary: New Insights from Women Rabbis on the 54 Weekly Haftarah Portions, the 5 Megillot & Special Shabbatot. Edited by Elyse Goldstein, pages 130–33. Woodstock, Vermont: Jewish Lights Publishing, 2004. .
Baruch J. Schwartz. "Leviticus." In The Jewish Study Bible. Edited by Adele Berlin and Marc Zvi Brettler, pages 238–43. New York: Oxford University Press, 2004. .
Antony Cothey. “Ethics and Holiness in the Theology of Leviticus.” Journal for the Study of the Old Testament, volume 30 (number 2) (December 2005): pages 131–51.
Professors on the Parashah: Studies on the Weekly Torah Reading Edited by Leib Moscovitz, pages 180–83. Jerusalem: Urim Publications, 2005.
Cecilia Wassen. Women in the Damascus Document, pages 50–51. Atlanta: Society of Biblical Literature, 2005.
Bernard J. Bamberger. "Leviticus." In The Torah: A Modern Commentary: Revised Edition. Edited by W. Gunther Plaut; revised edition edited by David E.S. Stern, pages 750–67. New York: Union for Reform Judaism, 2006. .
Calum Carmichael. Illuminating Leviticus: A Study of Its Laws and Institutions in the Light of Biblical Narratives. Baltimore: Johns Hopkins University Press, 2006. .
The Torah: A Women's Commentary. Edited by Tamara Cohn Eskenazi and Andrea L. Weiss, pages 657–78. New York: URJ Press, 2008. .
Suzanne A. Brody. "Blood." In Dancing in the White Spaces: The Yearly Torah Cycle and More Poems, page 89. Shelbyville, Kentucky: Wasteland Press, 2007. .

James L. Kugel. How To Read the Bible: A Guide to Scripture, Then and Now, page 303. New York: Free Press, 2007. .
Christophe Nihan. From Priestly Torah to Pentateuch: A Study in the Composition of the Book of Leviticus. Coronet Books, 2007. .
James W. Watts. Ritual and Rhetoric in Leviticus: From Sacrifice to Scripture. New York: Cambridge University Press, 2007. .
Roy E. Gane. "Leviticus." In Zondervan Illustrated Bible Backgrounds Commentary. Edited by John H. Walton, volume 1, pages 302–04. Grand Rapids, Michigan: Zondervan, 2009. .
Reuven Hammer. Entering Torah: Prefaces to the Weekly Torah Portion, pages 165–68. New York: Gefen Publishing House, 2009. .
Timothy Keller. "The Seduction of Success." In Counterfeit Gods: The Empty Promises of Money, Sex, and Power, and the Only Hope that Matters. Dutton Adult, 2009. . (Naaman).
Jay Michaelson. “It’s the Purity, Stupid: Reading Leviticus in Context: Parashat Metzora (Leviticus 14:1–15:33).” In Torah Queeries: Weekly Commentaries on the Hebrew Bible. Edited by Gregg Drinkwater, Joshua Lesser, and David Shneer; foreword by Judith Plaskow, pages 145–50. New York: New York University Press, 2009. .
Varda Polak-Sahm. The House of Secrets: The Hidden World of the Mikveh. Beacon Press, 2009. .
"Holy Water: A New Book Reveals the Secrets of the Mikveh." In Tablet Magazine. (August 31, 2009).
Mark Leuchter. “The Politics of Ritual Rhetoric: A Proposed Sociopolitical Context for the Redaction of Leviticus 1–16.” Vetus Testamentum, volume 60 (number 3) (2010): pages 345–65.
Zvi Sobolofsky. The Laws and Concepts of Niddah. Koren Publishers Jerusalem, 2010. .
Jeffrey Stackert. "Leviticus." In The New Oxford Annotated Bible: New Revised Standard Version with the Apocrypha: An Ecumenical Study Bible. Edited by Michael D. Coogan, Marc Z. Brettler, Carol A. Newsom, and Pheme Perkins, pages 161–65. New York: Oxford University Press, Revised 4th Edition 2010. .

Jonathan Haidt. The Righteous Mind: Why Good People Are Divided by Politics and Religion, page 148. New York: Pantheon, 2012. . (evolutionarily justified disgust as motivation for casting out lepers).
Shmuel Herzfeld. "He Lived To Teach." In Fifty-Four Pick Up: Fifteen-Minute Inspirational Torah Lessons, pages 160–63. Jerusalem: Gefen Publishing House, 2012. .
Tracy M. Lemos. “Where There Is Dirt, Is There System? Revisiting Biblical Purity Constructions.” Journal for the Study of the Old Testament, volume 37 (number 3) (March 2013): pages 265–94.

Peretz Rivkin, Yehuda Weingarten, Zusha Greisman. Parshath Nega'im with W'Tihar HaKohen Commentary (Tzaraath), volume 1, Hebrew Edition. CreateSpace Independent Publishing Platform, 2014. .
Jonathan Sacks. Covenant & Conversation: A Weekly Reading of the Jewish Bible: Leviticus: The Book of Holiness, pages 199–238. Jerusalem: Maggid Books, 2015. .
Jonathan Sacks. Lessons in Leadership: A Weekly Reading of the Jewish Bible, pages 147–51. New Milford, Connecticut: Maggid Books, 2015. .
Jonathan Sacks. Essays on Ethics: A Weekly Reading of the Jewish Bible, pages 177–82. New Milford, Connecticut: Maggid Books, 2016. .
Shai Held. The Heart of Torah, Volume 2: Essays on the Weekly Torah Portion: Leviticus, Numbers, and Deuteronomy, pages 42–51. Philadelphia: Jewish Publication Society, 2017. .
Steven Levy and Sarah Levy. The JPS Rashi Discussion Torah Commentary, pages 90–92. Philadelphia: Jewish Publication Society, 2017. .
Bhadra Sharma and Jeffrey Gettleman. “In Rural Nepal, Menstruation Taboo Claims Another Victim.” The New York Times. January 11, 2018, page A4.

External links
Masoretic text and 1917 JPS translation
Hear the parashah chanted
Hear the parashah read in Hebrew

Commentaries

Academy for Jewish Religion, California
Academy for Jewish Religion, New York
Aish.com 
Akhlah: The Jewish Children's Learning Network 
Aleph Beta Academy
American Jewish University — Ziegler School of Rabbinic Studies
Anshe Emes Synagogue, Los Angeles 
Ari Goldwag
Ascent of Safed
Bar-Ilan University
Chabad.org
eparsha.com
G-dcast
The Israel Koschitzky Virtual Beit Midrash
Jewish Agency for Israel 
Jewish Theological Seminary
Mechon Hadar
MyJewishLearning.com
Ohr Sameach
ON Scripture — The Torah 
Orthodox Union
OzTorah — Torah from Australia
Oz Ve Shalom — Netivot Shalom
Pardes from Jerusalem
Professor James L. Kugel
Professor Michael Carasik 
Rabbi Dov Linzer
Rabbi Fabian Werbin
Rabbi Jonathan Sacks
RabbiShimon.com 
Rabbi Shlomo Riskin
Rabbi Shmuel Herzfeld
Rabbi Stan Levin 
Reconstructionist Judaism 
Sephardic Institute
Shiur.com
613.org Jewish Torah Audio
Tanach Study Center
Teach613.org, Torah Education at Cherry Hill
TheTorah.com
Torah from Dixie 
Torah.org
TorahVort.com
Union for Reform Judaism
United Synagogue of Conservative Judaism
What's Bothering Rashi?
Yeshivat Chovevei Torah
Yeshiva University

Weekly Torah readings in Nisan
Weekly Torah readings in Iyar
Weekly Torah readings from Leviticus